The Mysterious Island is the English title for Jules Verne's 1874 novel L'Île mystérieuse.

The Mysterious Island or Mysterious Island may also refer to:

Works inspired by Jules Verne's novel
The Mysterious Island (1929 film), an adaptation of Jules Verne's novel, directed by Lucien Hubbard
Mysterious Island (1941 film), a USSR production, directed by Eduard Pentslin
Mysterious Island (serial), a 1951 serial directed by Spencer Gordon Bennet
Mysterious Island (1961 film), directed by Cy Endfield, also known as Jules Verne's Mysterious Island, featuring special effects from Ray Harryhausen
La isla misteriosa y el capitán Nemo, or L'Île mystérieuse, a 1973 TV miniseries directed by Juan Antonio Bardem and Henri Colpi and featuring Omar Sharif as Captain Nemo
Mysterious Island (TV series), a 1995 Canadian television series 
Mysterious Island (2005 film), a Hallmark Channel TV movie
Journey 2: The Mysterious Island, a 2012 film loosely based on Jules Verne's novel and a sequel to 2008 film Journey to the Center of the Earth
Jules Verne's Mysterious Island (2012 film), an adventure film

Others 
The Mysterious Islands, a 2009 documentary film by Vision Forum Films
Mysterious Island (Tokyo DisneySea), an attraction at Tokyo DisneySea
The Mysterious Island (1905 film), based on the Odyssey
Mysterious Island, alternate title for the 1982 film The Brave Archer and His Mate, a Hong Kong production, directed by Cheh Chang
Mysterious Island (2011 film), a Chinese horror film
Île Sans Nom, an island in Gironde, France also known as L'Île Mystérieuse

See also
The Land Before Time V: The Mysterious Island, a 1997 American animated film from The Land Before Time movies
The Little Polar Bear 2 – The Mysterious Island, a 2005 German animated film from The Little Polar Bear movies
 Mystery Island (disambiguation)